Adele Brandeis (1885–1975) was an American art administrator from Louisville, Kentucky. During the Great Depression of the 1930s, Brandeis worked for the WPA Federal Art Project and the Section of Painting and Sculpture. Brandeis did art research for the Index of American Design, a comprehensive collection of American material culture, and managed the creation of visual artwork by local artists. Brandeis focused on ensuring that Shaker art in Kentucky was recorded in the Index of American Design. She knew that the Shaker community near Harrodsburg was closed, and that furniture and other items were being auctioned off. In order to keep a record of the Shaker's furniture, weaving, clothing, and other work, Brandeis arranged for four artists to lodge in Harrodsburg and document the surviving Shaker arts for the Index. The materials in the Index informed the later reconstruction of Shakertown. Brandeis was the Director of Louisville Art Association in 1937.

In 1911, Brandeis presented a paper on "The Development of Art in Cincinnati" to the Women's Club of Louisville, where she highlighted the crucial role women had played in promoting art in Cincinnati. She encouraged her listeners to work toward the establishment of an art museum and art school in Louisville, which would then lead to greater development of the arts in Louisville.

Brandeis wrote for the Louisville Courier-Journal starting in 1945.  Among other jobs, she did research for the editorial page. She was the first woman to be nominated to the board of trustees of the University of Louisville and served various Kentucky art organizations.

Brandeis was the daughter of Alfred Brandeis, who was the brother of United States Supreme Court Justice Louis D. Brandeis, and Jennie Taussig.

References

1885 births
1975 deaths
American art historians
Writers from Louisville, Kentucky
University of Louisville people
Jewish American historians
Section of Painting and Sculpture artists
American women historians
20th-century American historians
Women art historians
Federal Art Project artists
20th-century American women writers
Courier Journal people
Kentucky women writers
Kentucky women artists